Rinka Falls is a waterfall in the Logar Valley, in the Municipality of Solčava in northern Slovenia. It is the source of the Savinja River. It has been proclaimed a natural heritage feature. Rinka Falls is one of the most beautiful and best-known waterfalls in Slovenia. It is also a popular tourist destination. It is visited in all seasons of the year. In the winter it is popular with ice-climbers. The best view of the waterfall is from Kamnik Saddle.

There are also four mountains in the vicinity called Rinka: Carniola Mount Rinka (Kranjska Rinka), Carinthia Mount Rinka (Koroška Rinka), Styria Mount Rinka (Štajerska Rinka), and Little Mount Rinka (Mala Rinka).

The name Rinka comes from the Slovene common noun rinka 'ring, hoop, link of a chain'. It is a borrowing from German (cf. Ringel, Ringl, etc.) and was used to designate a rounded or ring-like topographic feature.

References

External links 

Rinka Falls. Burger.si. Published by Boštjan Burger. A description, images and virtual panoramas. Rich media - may be viewed with QuickTime.

Waterfalls of Slovenia
Waterfalls in Styria (Slovenia)
Logar Valley (Slovenia)
Savinja